= Type, Texas =

Type
- Unincorporated community
- Interactive map of Type
- Location within Texas Type (the United States)
- Coordinates: 30°26′40″N 97°21′19″W
- Country: United States
- State: Texas
- County: Williamson County
- Elevation: 594 ft (181 m)
- GNIS feature ID: 2034670

Type is an unincorporated community located in Williamson County, Texas, United States.

== History ==
The community was established by Swedish immigrants as a crossroads town in the early 1900s. A school named The Type School was established in the community after 1900, which had 38 students in 1903. A Swedish Evangelical Church was organized in Type in 1908. By 1940, the community had a population of 20. The Type school was consolidated to the Coupland School in 1945, and by 1949 the community had a population of 40, in which its population count then remained stagnant through 2000.
